Wei Chun-heng (born June 6, 1994) is a Taiwanese competitive archer. He won a bronze medal in the men's team recurve at the 2015 Asian Championships, and also competed as a member of Chinese Taipei's archery squad at the 2016 Summer Olympics.

Wei was selected to compete for the Taiwanese squad at the 2016 Summer Olympics in Rio de Janeiro, shooting both in individual and team recurve tournaments. First, Wei amassed a total of 679 points out of a maximum 720 to lead the Taiwanese trio for the ninth seed heading to the knockout stage, along with his team's score of 1,995 collected from the classification round. Entering the men's team recurve as the seventh-seeded squad, Wei and his compatriots Kao Hao-wen and Yu Guan-lin succumbed unexpectedly to a tough 2–6 defeat from the unheralded Indonesians in their elimination round match. Rebounding from his team's premature exit, Wei quickly dispatched Fiji's experienced Olympian Rob Elder in straight sets to book the round of 32 spot in the men's individual recurve, before he dropped the match in a grueling 5–6 shoot-off to Thailand's Witthaya Thamwong.

References

External links
 

1994 births
Living people
Taiwanese male archers
Sportspeople from Taoyuan City
Olympic archers of Taiwan
Archers at the 2016 Summer Olympics
Universiade medalists in archery
Asian Games medalists in archery
Archers at the 2018 Asian Games
Asian Games gold medalists for Chinese Taipei
Medalists at the 2018 Asian Games
Universiade silver medalists for Chinese Taipei
Medalists at the 2015 Summer Universiade
Medalists at the 2017 Summer Universiade
Medalists at the 2019 Summer Universiade
Archers at the 2020 Summer Olympics
Medalists at the 2020 Summer Olympics
Olympic medalists in archery
Olympic silver medalists for Taiwan
World Archery Championships medalists
20th-century Taiwanese people
21st-century Taiwanese people